Raima is a multinational technology company headquartered in Seattle, USA. The company was founded in 1982. Raima develops, sells and supports in-memory and disk-based Relational Database Management Systems that can either be embedded within the application or be in a client/server mode. The company's focus is on OLTP databases with high-intensity transactional processing. Their cross-platform, small-footprint products are made to collect, store, manage and move data.

History 
Raima was founded in Seattle, Washington USA in 1982 by two software engineering researchers from Boeing, Randy Merilatt and Wayne Warren, who saw the benefits that database management technology could provide for software application developers in the rapidly growing microcomputer industry. In 1984 Raima released one of the first embedded database management systems for microcomputer applications written in the C programming language. Early contracts with companies like ROLM (now part of IBM), Texas Instruments, Microsoft, ADP and others contributed to the development of the Raima Database Manager (RDM) product family.

Some of the more significant Raima product releases are shown below.

 1984 - Raima releases db_VISTA (currently named, "RDM Embedded") version 1. A single-user, network-model database management system (DBMS) for C language applications on MS-DOS and Unix.
 1986 - db_VISTA version 2 is released, adding a portable (file locks stored in a lock file), multi-user DBMS with transaction level database consistency.
 1987 - db_QUERY released, providing the first SQL-like query tool for accessing a network-model database.
 1988 - db_VISTA version 3 is released, with a system-wide lock manager process that manages all file locks.
 1990 - Raima releases db_VISTA for Microsoft Windows.
 1992 - Raima Database Server version 1 (a.k.a. "Velocis" and, today, "RDM Server") is introduced, providing a client/server DBMS with record-level locking and SQL designed to be tightly integrated with sophisticated applications written in C. Multiple platform support for MS-DOS/Novell NetWare, OS/2 and Unix. The first full-featured DBMS to support the ODBC SQL API as its native SQL API.
 1996 - Velocis 1.0: Hot online backup.
 1998 - Velocis 2.1: True multi-threading, application link.
 2006 - RDM Server 7.2: Dynamic DDL.
 2009 - RDM Server 8.3: SQL triggers and enhanced join syntax.
 2010 - RDM Embedded 10.0: Multi-core computer support using Transactional File Servers with high-performance, MVCC-based read-only transactions.
 2011 - SQL for RDM Embedded 10.1.
 2012 - ODBC/JDBC/ADO.NET support for RDM 11.0.
 2013 – RDM 12.0: Database cursors, shared memory protocol memory allocation limitation, enhanced SQL optimization support, three new data types, bulk insert API, “dirty read” isolation level, enhanced encryption, selective replication and notification.
 2016 – RDM 14.0: Consolidating both the source code lines and features in Raima Embedded and RDM Server into one source code in Raima Database Manager v. 14.0. RDM 14.0 includes these major features: updated in-memory support, dirty reads, R-Tree support, compression, encryption, SQL, SQL PL,  and platform independence—develop once, deploy anywhere. RMD 14.0 includes portability options such as direct copy and paste that permit development and deployment on different target platforms, regardless of architecture or byte order. The release includes a streamlined interface that is cursor-based, extended SQL support and stored procedures that support SQL PL; it also supports ODBC (C, C++), ADO.NET (C#) and JDBC (Java). Supported development environments include Microsoft Visual Studio, Apple XCode, Eclipse and Wind River Workbench. A redesigned and optimized database file format architecture maintains ACID compliance and data safeguards, with separate formats for in-memory, on-disk or hybrid storage. File formats hide hardware platform specifics (e.g., byte ordering). Download packages include examples of RDM speed and performance benchmarks.
2018 – RDM 14.1: This new release focuses on ease of use, portability, and speed. With Raima's new file format, you can develop once and deploy anywhere. Performance is increased by over 50-100% depending on the use case when compared to previous RDM releases. Raima has extended and improved SQL support, snapshots, and geospatial functionality.
2020 – RDM 14.2: Continuous focus on ease of use, portability, and speed. Multi-user Focused Storage Format: the updated database file format increase database throughput through a focus on locking contention prevention. Extended and improved geospatial functionality and a newly supported REST-ful interface have been added to the database server functionality.
2021 – RDM 15.0: Speed, ease of use and new functionality. Custom generated time series support has been added to RDM. Also FFT support for data transformations. An administrative GUI is introduced.
2022 – RDM 15.2: Comes with Raima to Raima replication, hot backup, and enhanced encryption. Diagnostics for more specific information to be obtained from the Raima sub- systems. Raima to Cloud replication through SymmetricDS. 

In June, 1999 Raima was acquired by Centura Software (formerly Gupta). In the summer of 2001, the Norwegian company Birdstep Technology acquired the Raima assets from Centura and operated Raima as a separate business unit out of Seattle. In the summer of 2010, the Raima management team purchased Raima from Birdstep, forming the now privately held Raima Incorporated.

Products and services 
Raima delivers and supports multiple Raima Database Manager solutions, which are designed for distributed architectures and can either be embedded and completely managed within the application, or in a client/server mode. Their architecture, platform independence, high performance and small footprint enable Raima Database Manager products to be used in a variety of applications, from small, resource-constrained devices all the way up to enterprise class environments.

Applications 
Raima database products are used in a wide range of applications for business critical data transactions, flight control systems, military equipment, data backup solutions, medical equipment, routers and switches, and more. Aker Solutions, Boeing, General Dynamics, GE Power, GE Grid solutions, Mitsubishi, Schneider Electric, Schlumberger, and Siemens are examples of customers who embed Raima Database Manager products into their applications.

References

External links 
 

Software companies based in Seattle
Software companies of the United States